Anne Malherbe Gosselin (born Anne Malherbe on December 16, 1968) is the wife of Rafael Correa, President of Ecuador from January 2007 until May 2017. She was born in Namur, Belgium, as the daughter of Paul Malherbe and Chantal Gosselin. She met Correa while both were attending courses in the University of Louvain (UCLouvain), in Belgium. They later married and, during Correa's presidency, set up residency in Ecuador. After the end of Correa's presidency, the couple moved to Belgium.

Public statements 
After Correa's inauguration, Malherbe opted to keep a low public profile, remaining completely focused on her duties as a mother and wife. The only public statement of a political nature was during the first weeks of President Correa's term in office, made concerning the perceived duties of the First Lady; she alleged that "we, women are all equal" giving reassurances to all people that hold the belief of a self intrinsic value as individuals and not for their spouse's position.

Malherbe won sympathy from the Ecuadorian people, who until then knew very little of her, after a public statement on 31 July 2007 when during a telephone interview with EFE she referred to the case of an Ecuadorian child, Angélica Loja Cajamarca, who together with her mother had been detained in Belgium for not carrying a photo ID and were held at a center for undocumented migrants. Malherbe said she was ashamed of what her country did to a child, who was eleven years old. After this interview she returned to her daily routine away from the public eye.

Malherbe has actually never been referred or presented as First Lady of Ecuador, due to the socialist beliefs of Correa whom accordingly thinks that in an "equal socialist society there should not be a first lady as all its citizens men and women are the same." The duties of the First Lady were transferred to Patronato San José first, and now are part of the Ministry of Social Inclusion.

References 

 

 

1968 births
Living people
First ladies of Ecuador
People from Namur (city)
Belgian emigrants to Ecuador
Ecuadorian people of Belgian descent
Walloon people
Université catholique de Louvain alumni
21st-century Ecuadorian women politicians
21st-century Ecuadorian politicians